Deh Shirak (also Romanized as Deh Shīrak and Deh-e Shīrak; also known as Deh Shīr) is a village in Pariz Rural District, Pariz District, Sirjan County, Kerman Province, Iran. At the 2006 census, its population was 176, in 47 families.

References 

Populated places in Sirjan County